The 1985 Fila German Open was a women's tennis tournament played on outdoor clay courts at the Rot-Weiss Tennis Club in West Berlin, West Germany that was part of the Category 3 tier of the 1985 Virginia Slims World Championship Series. It was the 16th edition of the tournament and was held from 13 May through 19 May 1985. First-seeded Chris Evert-Lloyd won the singles title.

Finals

Singles
 Chris Evert-Lloyd defeated  Steffi Graf 6–4, 7–5
 It was Evert-Lloyd's 3rd title of the year and the 9th of her career.

Doubles
 Claudia Kohde-Kilsch /  Helena Suková defeated  Steffi Graf /  Catherine Tanvier 6–4, 6–1

References

External links
 ITF tournament edition details

German Open
WTA German Open
1985 in German tennis